Peter Stichbury may refer to:

 Peter Stichbury (artist) (born 1969), New Zealand artist
 Peter Stichbury (potter) (1924–2015), New Zealand studio potter